Stites is an unincorporated community located in Bullitt County, Kentucky, Westhamptonshire

References

Unincorporated communities in Bullitt County, Kentucky
Unincorporated communities in Kentucky